The Clube Desportivo Primeiro de Agosto is a multisports club from Luanda, Angola. The club's men's roller hockey team competes at the local level, at the Luanda Provincial Roller Hockey Championship and at the Angolan Roller Hockey Championship.

Honours
Angola Hockey League:
Winner (2): 1988, 2015
 Runner Up (1) : 2014

Angola Cup:
Winner (n/a): 
 Runner Up (1) : 2015

Angola Super Cup:
Winner (n/a): 
 Runner Up (2) : 2016, 2017

Squad

Players

Manager history

See also
Primeiro de Agosto Football
Primeiro de Agosto Basketball
Primeiro de Agosto Handball
Primeiro de Agosto Volleyball
Federação Angolana de Andebol

References

External links
 hoqueidagosto.blogspot
  
 Facebook profile

C.D. Primeiro de Agosto
Sports clubs in Angola
Roller hockey clubs in Angola